Adorer Jamai is a  Bengali action comedy film directed by Shahadat Hossain Liton and produced by Impress Telefilm Limited. The film features Shakib Khan and Apu Biswas in the lead roles, with Nipun and Misha Sawdagor in other pivotal roles.

Cast
 Shakib Khan
 Apu Biswas
 Nipun Akter
 Misha Sawdagor
 Sadek Bachchu

Music
The film's music was directed by Ali Akram Shuvo.

Awards
  Meril Prothom Alo Awards
 Nominate: Best Actor - Shakib Khan (Critics Choice)
 Nominate: Best Actress - Nipun (Critics Choice)

References

2011 films
2011 action comedy films
Bengali-language Bangladeshi films
Bangladeshi action comedy films
Films scored by Ali Akram Shuvo
2010s Bengali-language films
2011 comedy films